The so-called "For Delayed Birth" is an Old English poetic medical text found in the manuscript London, British Library, Harley 585, ff. 185r-v, in a collection of medical texts known since the nineteenth century as Lacnunga (‘remedies’). The manuscript was probably copied in the early eleventh century, though its sources may have been older.

The text is in fact a set of prose instructions which include a series of short poems which should be recited as part of one or more rituals. The text is an important witness to non-orthodox Anglo-Saxon Christian religious practice and to women's history: it is unique among Anglo-Saxon medical texts for being explicitly for use and recitation by a woman. However, 'this charm is perhaps misnamed, because it deals, not with delayed birth as such, but with the inability of the wifman [woman] for whom it is written to conceive at all, or to bring a child to term without miscarriage.'

Text

As edited by Elliott Van Kirk Dobbie but with long vowels marked with acute accents, the text runs:

References

Editions
 Foys, Martin et al. Old English Poetry in Facsimile Project (Center for the History of Print and Digital Culture, University of Wisconsin-Madison, 2019-); digital facsimile edition and Modern English translation

Anglo-Saxon metrical charms
Old English medicine